The Sunova Spiel at East St. Paul is an annual bonspiel, or curling tournament, held at the East St. Paul Curling Club in East St. Paul, Manitoba. It has been a part of the Men's and Women's World Curling Tour since 2014. The tournament is held in a triple knockout format.

Men

Past champions

Women

Past champions

References

World Curling Tour events
Curling competitions in Manitoba
2014 establishments in Manitoba